Stafford Regional Airport  is a public airport located three miles (5 km) southwest of the central business district of Stafford, the county seat of Stafford County, Virginia, United States. It is owned and operated by the Stafford Regional Airport Authority, an independent body of representatives from Stafford and Prince William Counties and the City of Fredericksburg.

Although most U.S. airports use the same three-letter location identifier for the FAA and IATA, Stafford Regional Airport is assigned RMN by the FAA but has no designation from the IATA (which assigned RMN to Rumginae, Papua New Guinea).

Facilities and aircraft 
For the 12-month period ending December 31, 2004, the airport had 7,667 aircraft operations, an average of 21 per day: 93% general aviation and 7% military.

Accidents 
The airport was the site of a fatal accident on February 22, 2006, involving a Lancair Columbia 400 piloted by a private pilot.  The pilot and three passengers were killed when the aircraft flew into trees surrounding the runway after an aborted landing attempt via ILS.  Following an investigation, the NTSB cited pilot error as the most likely cause of the accident.

References

External links 

Transportation in Stafford County, Virginia
Airports in Virginia
Buildings and structures in Stafford County, Virginia